The Westchester County Center is a 5,000-seat multi-purpose arena in White Plains, New York. It hosts various local concerts and sporting events for the area.

The County Center was conceived by the Westchester Recreation Commission in 1924 as a multi-purpose indoor recreational facility to host community programs and income-producing commercial events.  It was designed by the architectural firm of Walker & Gillette, and built and decorated in the Art Deco style. The construction project cost approximately $785,000; a $16-million rehabilitation was completed in 1988.

Notable events
 Grand opening was held May 22, 1930 features pianist Percy Grainger, Metropolitan Opera Company tenor Edward Johnson, organist Palmer Christian  
 First Westchester Music Festival is held in July, 1930 in the newly opened center 
 Governor Herbert H. Lehman winds up his campaign with an address at a rally of the American Labor party in 1936 
 Joe Baksi, future heavyweight contender, beat future movie actor Jack Palance (who fought under the name of Jack Brazzo) on December 17, 1940.
 The boxrec database lists nearly 500 cards held at Westchester over the years dating back to 1934, with televised Tuesday night bouts a staple in the early 1950s.
 The Who played a show including their rock opera Tommy on November 3, 1969.
The New York Guard, a team in the short-lived All-American Basketball Alliance, played here in 1978.
 The Westchester Golden Apples, a charter franchise of the minor league, summertime United States Basketball League, played at the County Center in 1985. A second USBL team, the Westchester Kings, played at the Center in 1997.
 The New York Liberties volleyball team used the Center as their home venue in 1988.
 Since the fall of 2014, it has been the home of the Westchester Knicks, the New York Knicks' farm team in the NBA G League.
 In 2018, it became the primary home of the New York Liberty of the Women's National Basketball Association. The Liberty were purchased in 2019 by the owner of the Brooklyn Nets and will be moved to the Barclays Center in 2020.
 In 2019, the arena was the home venue for the expansion New York Streets of the National Arena League. As the arena was too small to fit a regulation indoor football field of 50 yards plus end zones, the team played on a field that was marked as 50-yard field but was actually about 38 yards. The Streets folded after one season.
 During March 2020, it was announced that the Westchester County Center would be used to hold non-COVID-19 patients during the COVID-19 pandemic. During a March 30, 2020 press conference in the White House Rose Garden, President Donald Trump discussed the conversion of the Westchester County Center to a makeshift hospital, although he referred to it as the "Westchester Community Center."

References

External links
 

Buildings and structures in White Plains, New York
Indoor arenas in New York (state)
Sports venues in New York (state)
Art Deco architecture in New York (state)
Sports venues in Westchester County, New York
Convention centers in New York (state)
Basketball venues in New York (state)
Boxing venues in New York (state)
NBA G League venues
New York Liberty venues
Westchester Knicks
Volleyball venues in New York (state)
1930 establishments in New York (state)
Sports venues completed in 1930